Sybrinus simonyi is a species of beetle in the family Cerambycidae. It was described by Gahan in 1903.

References

Desmiphorini
Beetles described in 1903